Elena Sotgiu (born 18 July 1995) is a Belgian field hockey player for the Belgian national team.

She participated at the 2018 Women's Hockey World Cup.

References

External links 
 

1995 births
Living people
Belgian female field hockey players
Female field hockey goalkeepers